The 12th annual Miss Earth México pageant was held at Hotel Barceló of Huatulco, Oaxaca on October 26, 2013. Thirty-two contestants of the Mexican Republic competed for the national title, which was won by Kristal Silva from Tamaulipas who later competed in Miss Earth 2013 in Philippines where she was a Finalist in the Top 8. Silva was crowned by outgoing Miss Earth México titleholder Paola Aguilar. She is the second Tamaulipeca to win this title.

Results

Miss Earth México

Order of Announcements

Top 16

Top 8

Top 4

Special Awards

Judges

Preliminary Competition

Final Competition

Background Music

Partial Contestants

Contestants notes

Crossovers
Contestants who previously competed or will compete at other beauty pageants:

Miss Earth
 2013: : Kristal Silva (Top 8)

Miss Universe
 2016: : Kristal Silva (Top 9)

Face of the Universe
 2014: : Lidia Quiroz

Miss Iberoamérica
 2014: : Tania Lara (Winner)

Nuestra Belleza Latina
2013: : Ana Corral

Nuestra Belleza México
 2015: : Cristal Silva (Winner)
2015: : Ana Lilia Alpuche (Top 10)

Nuestra Belleza Baja California
 2013: : Lidia Quiroz
 2015: : Lidia Quiroz

Nuestra Belleza Campeche
2015: : Ana Lilia Alpuche (Winner)

Nuestra Belleza Chiapas
2011: : Tania Lara

Nuestra Belleza Chihuahua
2014: : Ana Corral

Nuestra Belleza Durango
2012: : Daniela Castillo

Nuestra Belleza Tamaulipas
 2013: : Cristal Silva (Suplente/1st Runner-up)
 2015: : Cristal Silva (Winner)

Nuestra Belleza Cd. Victoria 
 2013: : Cristal Silva (Winner)

Nuestra Belleza Los Cabos
 2013: : Estefanía Olachea

Reina Calafia
 2012: : Estefanía Olachea

References

External links
Official Website

2013
2013 in Mexico
2013 beauty pageants